This is a list of all stations of the Pune Metro, a rapid transit system serving the city of Pune in Maharashtra, India.

Pune Metro is the 15th metro system in India.

It is built and operated by the Maharashtra Metro Rail Corporation Limited being inaugurated and opened for public on 6 March 2022.

Metro stations

Statistics

See also 

 Pune Metro
 Aqua Line (Pune Metro)
 Purple Line (Pune Metro)
 Maharashtra Metro Rail Corporation Limited

References 

Pune Metro

Pune-related lists